St. Joseph's Parish is a Roman Catholic parish church located in Ottawa, Ontario, Canada. It is an Anglophone congregation located very near its partner parish, the Francophone Église Sacré-Cœur.

History
The parish was founded in 1856 by missionaries from the Missionary Oblates of Mary Immaculate. The church was built on what was believed to be the resting places of many labourers killed in the construction of the Rideau Canal.

In 1828, Lieutenant-Colonel John By granted land (most of today's Sandy Hill) to one of his lieutenants, René Léonard Besserer.  Besserer died in March 1823, and his older brother Louis-Théodore Besserer was his heir.  Louis Besserer immediately set to work dividing Sandy Hill into lots, however those lots proved difficult to sell due to the sandy and unproductive land, and the lack of churches, schools and business.  By 1845, Besserer transferred six of these lots over to the Roman Catholic Church for them to establish a church and a college. On this land was built the first Saint Joseph's Church, and the re-located College of Ottawa.

On 29 August 1856 Saint Joseph's Parish was founded. In 1857, Rev. Damase Dandurand, a Roman Catholic priest and member of the Oblate Order, designed St. Joseph's "near the College in St. George's Ward", which was styled in a "Rustico-Tuscan order". The first church was not consecrated until 19 March 1858.  The building was a small traditional stone church with few notable architectural features, other than a clock above the door, and the first church bells in Ottawa.  It could seat 230 parishioners on its 92 benches.  Following the naming of Ottawa as the capital and the subsequent transfer of a few hundred civil servants to Ottawa, many of those civil servants began to attend Saint Joseph's.  As a result of this, it was decided that the church was too small, and in 1866 two transepts were added.  Those two transepts added 138 new benches, bringing the total number of benches up to 230.  The congregation continued to grow.  In 1889, the church's French community built their own church.  Despite the building of the Église Sacré-Cœur (which is still standing just across Laurier) and the 100 families that left Saint Joseph's, the old church was still too small for the ever-growing congregation, and on 23 April 1890, the Superior General of the Oblates authorised the preparation of plans for a new church.  The last mass was held at the original Saint Joseph's in February 1892.

On 23 January 1892, a contract was signed with William Edward Doran of Montreal to build the second church on Wilbrod Street at Cumberland Street 1892-93.   Construction began four months later, and the cornerstone ceremony was held on 26 June 1892.  The new church was dedicated on 19 November 1893, and could seat 1100 people.  The second church was 62’ high, 192’ long, 75’ wide (expanding to 105’ at the transepts), and had a 192’ tall tower.  The church was built in the Roman Renaissance style, and was decorated in a way that was similar to Notre Dame.  One notable detail of the construction is that the foundation was well enough built that it was able to be reused when the current church was built.  The second church survived for 37 years before it was destroyed by fire on the night of 27 December 1930.

Work on the third church was commenced shortly after the fire.  Not only was the church built on the foundations of the second church, parts of the exterior wall up to the stained glass windows were retained.  In rebuilding the church, the architectural style was changed from Roman Renaissance to Neo-Gothic, and in order to make the building more fire-resistant, Father Finnegan replaced the varnished wooden walls with bare cement brick walls.  On 4 January 1932, then archbishop Guillaume Forbes of Ottawa consecrated the marble altar.  It is this third church that still stands today.

Two brass plaques were erected by the St Joseph's Parish in honour of those parishioners who served with the allied forces in World War I, many of whom laid down their lives. 
A memorial framed scroll with the names of all members of St. Joseph`s parish who volunteered for active service with Canada`s fighting forces in the Second World War and a Memorial Book with short biographies of those members who gave their lives were erected by the St Joseph`s parish.

The current pastor is Fr. Jim Bleackley, OMI, replacing the former pastor, Fr. Richard Beaudette, OMI, who in turn succeeded Fr. Andy Boyer in October 2015.

References

Bibliography

External links

Parish homepage

Roman Catholic churches in Ottawa